Clepsis monochroa is a species of moth of the family Tortricidae. It is found in South Africa.

The wingspan is about 11.5 mm. The ground colour of the forewings is cream, the veins tinged with orange in the dorsal half of the wing. At the costal third, the ground colour is mixed with ochreous and at the costa with brown. The hindwings are cream.

References

Endemic moths of South Africa
Moths described in 2006
Clepsis